Neo-Marxism is a Marxist school of thought encompassing 20th-century approaches that amend or extend Marxism and Marxist theory, typically by incorporating elements from other intellectual traditions such as critical theory, psychoanalysis, or existentialism (in the case of Jean-Paul Sartre).

As with many uses of the prefix neo-, some theorists and groups who are designated as neo-Marxists have attempted to supplement the perceived deficiencies of orthodox Marxism or dialectical materialism. Many prominent neo-Marxists, such as Herbert Marcuse and other members of the Frankfurt School, have historically been sociologists and psychologists.

Neo-Marxism comes under the broader framework of the New Left. In a sociological sense, neo-Marxism adds Max Weber's broader understanding of social inequality, such as status and power, to Marxist philosophy. Examples of neo-Marxism include analytical Marxism, French structural Marxism, critical theory, cultural studies, as well as some forms of feminism. Erik Olin Wright's theory of contradictory class locations is an example of the syncretism found in neo-Marxist thought, as it incorporates Weberian sociology, critical criminology, and anarchism.

History 
Neo-Marxism developed as a result of social and political problems that traditional Marxist theory was unable to sufficiently address. This iteration of thinking tended toward peaceful ideological dissemination, rather than the revolutionary, and often violent, methods of the past. Economically, neo-Marxist leaders moved beyond the era of public outcry over class warfare and attempted to design viable models to solve it. 

There are many different branches of neo-Marxism often not in agreement with each other and their theories. Following World War I, some neo-Marxists dissented and later formed the Frankfurt School. The Frankfurt School never identified themselves as neo-Marxists. Toward the end of the 20th century, neo-Marxism and other Marxist theories became anathema in democratic and capitalistic Western cultures, where the term attained negative connotations during the Red Scare. For this reason, social theorists of the same ideology since that time have tended to disassociate themselves from the term neo-Marxism. Examples of such thinkers include David Harvey and Jacque Fresco, with some ambiguity surrounding Noam Chomsky, who has been labelled a neo-Marxist by some, but who personally disagrees with such assessments. Some consider libertarian socialism an example of rebranded neo-Marxism.

Neo-Marxian economics 

The terms "neo-Marxian", "post-Marxian", and "radical political economics" were first used to refer to a distinct tradition of economic theory in the 1970s and 1980s that stems from Marxian economic thought. Many of the leading figures were associated with the leftist Monthly Review School. The neo-Marxist approach to development economics is connected with dependency and world systems theories. In these cases, the 'exploitation' that classifies it as Marxist is an external one, rather than the normal 'internal' exploitation of classical Marxism.

In industrial economics, the neo-Marxian approach stresses the monopolistic and oligarchical rather than the competitive nature of capitalism. This approach is associated with Michał Kalecki, Paul A. Baran, and Paul Sweezy.

Such theorists as Samuel Bowles, David Gordon, John Roemer, Herbert Gintis, Jon Elster, and Adam Przeworski have adopted the techniques of neoclassical economics, including game theory and mathematical modeling, to demonstrate Marxian concepts such as exploitation and class conflict.

The neo-Marxian approach integrated non-Marxist or "bourgeois" economics from the post-Keynesians like Joan Robinson and the neo-Ricardian school of Piero Sraffa. Polish economists Michał Kalecki, Rosa Luxemburg, Henryk Grossman, Adam Przeworski, and Oskar Lange were influential in this school, particularly in developing theories of underconsumption. While most official communist parties denounced neo-Marxian theories as "bourgeois economics," some neo-Marxians served as advisers to socialist or Third World developing governments. Neo-marxist theories were also influential in the study of Imperialism.

Despite being an orthodox Marxist economist, Maurice Dobb was also associated with this current.

Concepts 
Big business can maintain selling prices at high levels while still competing to cut costs, advertise and market their products. However, competition is generally limited with a few large capital formations sharing various markets, with the exception of a few actual monopolies (such as the Bell System at the time). The economic surpluses that result cannot be absorbed through consumers spending more. The concentration of the surplus in the hands of the business elite must therefore be geared towards imperialistic and militaristic government tendencies, which is the easiest and surest way to utilise surplus productive capacity.

Exploitation focuses on low wage workers and groups at home, especially minorities. Average earners see the pressures in drive for production destroy their human relationships, leading to wider alienation and hostility. The whole system is largely irrational since though individuals may make rational decisions, the ultimate systemic goals are not. The system continues to function so long as Keynesian full employment policies are pursued, but there is the continued threat to stability from less-developed countries throwing off the restraints of neo-colonial domination.

Labor theory of value 
Paul A. Baran introduced the concept of potential economic surplus to deal with novel complexities raised by the dominance of monopoly capital, in particular the theoretical prediction that monopoly capitalism would be associated with low capacity utilization, and hence potential surplus would typically be much larger than the realized surplus. With Paul Sweezy, Baran elaborated the importance of this innovation, its consistency with Marx's labor concept of value and supplementary relation to Marx's category of surplus value.

According to Baran's categories:

 Actual economic surplus: "the difference between what society's actual current output and its actual current consumption." Hence, it is equal to current savings or accumulation.
 Potential economic surplus: "the difference between that output that could be produced in a given natural and technical environment with the help of employable productive resources, and what might be regarded as essential consumption."

Baran also introduced the concept of planned surplus—a category that could only be operationalized in a rationally planned socialist society. This was defined as "the difference between society's 'optimum' output available in a historically given natural and technological environment under conditions of planned 'optimal' utilization of all available productive resources, and some chosen 'optimal' volume of consumption."

Baran used the surplus concept to analyze underdeveloped economies (or what are now more optimistically called "developing economies") in his Political Economy of Growth.

Neo-Marxist feminism 
Some portions of Marxist feminism have used the neo-Marxist label. This school of thought believes that the means of knowledge, culture, and pedagogy are part of a privileged epistemology. Neo-Marxist feminism relies heavily on critical theory and seeks to apply those theories in psychotherapy as the means of political and cultural change. Teresa McDowell and Rhea Almeida use these theories in a therapy method called "liberation based healing," which, like many other forms of Marxism, uses sample bias in the many interrelated liberties in order to magnify the "critical consciousness" of the participants towards unrest of the status quo.

See also 

 Analytical Marxism
 Budapest School (Lukács)
 Freudo-Marxism
 Left communism
 Libertarian Marxism
 Marxian economics
 Marxist feminism
 Marxist humanism
 Neue Marx-Lektüre
 Open Marxism
 Post-Marxism
 Socialism of the 21st century
 State derivation
 Western Marxism
 Young Marx

References

Sources 
 Blackledge, Paul, and Perry Anderson. 2004. Marxism, and the New Left. Merlin Press. .
 Holz, Hans Heinz. 1972. Strömungen und Tendenzen im Neomarxismus. München: Carl Hanser Verlag. .
 Müller, Horst. 1986. Praxis und Hoffnung. Studien zur Philosophie und Wissenschaft gesellschaftlicher Praxis von Marx bis Bloch und Lefebvre. Bochum: Germinal Verlag. .
 von Weiss, Andreas. 1970. Neomarxismus. Die Problemdiskussion im Nachfolgemarximus der Jahre 1945 bis 1970. Freiburg/München: Karl-Alber-Verlag. .

Further reading 
 Willis, Kate. Theories and Practices of Development (2nd ed.). Routledge.
 Woods, Alan. "An outline of Marxist economics." Ch. 6 in Reformism or Revolution.

External links 

 Neo-Marxism: An Attempt at Reformation
 Liberation Based Healing

 Marxist Economics Courses, Links and Information
 Marxian Economics (archive from Schwartz center of economic policy analysis)
 Marxian Political Economy
 The Neo-Marxian Schools (archive from Schwartz center of economic policy analysis)
 A Marxian Introduction to Modern Economics
 International working group on value theory
 The End of the Market A website containing a critical evaluation the idea of the market-clearing price which affirms Marx's theory that in capitalism profitability would decline.
 The Neo-Marxian Schools ("Radical Political Economy")

 
Eponymous political ideologies
Imperialism studies
Marxist feminism
Marxist theory
New Left
Types of socialism